Cappa is an Italian surname. Notable people with the surname include:

Adam Cappa (born 1985), American musician
Andrea Cappa (born 1993), Italian football player
Alex Cappa (born 1995), American football player
Benedetta Cappa (1897–1977), Italian artist 
Goffredo Cappa (1644–1717), Italian luthier
Guglielmo Cappa (1844–1905), Italian engineer 
Paolo Cappa (1888–1956), Italian journalist, lawyer and politician
Catherine Scorsese, née Cappa (1912–1997), Italian-American actress

Italian-language surnames